The Croods: A New Age (also known as The Croods 2) is a 2020 American computer-animated adventure comedy film produced by DreamWorks Animation and distributed by Universal Pictures. The sequel to The Croods (2013) as well as the second film in The Croods franchise, it was directed by Joel Crawford (in his feature directorial debut) from a screenplay by Paul Fisher, Bob Logan, and the writing team of Dan and Kevin Hageman, based on a story by Kirk DeMicco and Chris Sanders, the directors of the previous film. The film features the returning voices of Nicolas Cage, Emma Stone, Ryan Reynolds, Catherine Keener, Clark Duke, and Cloris Leachman (in her final voice role) alongside new additions to the cast including Peter Dinklage, Leslie Mann, and Kelly Marie Tran. The film follows The Croods, Guy and their pets Belt, Chunky and Douglas, as they discover an idyllic, walled-in paradise that meets all of its needs. Unfortunately, they must also learn to live with the Bettermans, a family with a couple of steps above the Croods on the evolutionary ladder.

A sequel to The Croods was first announced in April 2013, with directors DiMicco and Sanders returning to helm the film. Its development continued through 2014 and 2015 until its cancellation in November 2016 due to the doubts in response to Universal's acquisition of DreamWorks. However, the project was revived in September 2017 with Crawford replacing Sanders and DiMicco as director in the following month. Due to the COVID-19 pandemic in the United States, much of the final animations were done from the crew's homes.

The Croods: A New Age was theatrically released in the United States on November 25, 2020. It grossed over $216 million worldwide against its $65 million budget and received generally positive reviews, with critics calling it "a decent-enough follow-up" and praising the cast. The film was also nominated for the Golden Globe Award for Best Animated Feature Film.

Plot
A flashback shows the death of Guy's parents when he was a child. As they drown in tar, they tell him to find somewhere called "tomorrow". He goes on a long journey and meets a young Belt before taking him along for the ride. This eventually leads up to events of meeting Eep and her family.

The Croods, along with Guy and their pets Chunky and Douglas, are still searching for a place to settle down, all the while surviving many dangerous creatures along the way. Grug is repeatedly annoyed at Eep and Guy's blossoming romance, fearing they may separate from the rest of the pack. This fear intensifies after Guy proposes to Eep that they find their own "tomorrow" without the rest of the Croods. As Grug walks off in anger, he soon comes across a giant wall and leads the whole pack to it. On the other side lays an idyllic paradise-like land rich in agriculture that the Croods quickly become enamored with. However, they are soon caught in a net and are released by the owners of the land, a couple called Phil and Hope Betterman, who were best friends with Guy's parents before their deaths and Guy's disappearance. The Bettermans welcome the Croods to their giant tree-home as house guests, where they meet their daughter and Guy's old friend, Dawn, who immediately befriends Eep. Life with the Bettermans becomes degrading for Grug as the Bettermans soon reveal themselves to be technologically advanced, better-mannered, and visibly condescending toward the Croods. Believing that Guy is better off with them, they hatch a scheme to get Guy to leave the Croods. Phil eventually takes Grug to his secret man-cave, a sauna-like place behind some waterfalls, where he manipulates him into believing Guy should leave their pack in exchange for Eep staying with her family. Meanwhile, Hope angers Ugga by insulting her family's lifestyle and attempts to manipulate her like Phil, but fails, thus leading to Ugga and Grug's decision to leave.

Sometime after this, Eep discovers that Dawn has never left the inside of the wall. Relating this to the solitude she faced in her cave, Eep convinces Dawn to use Chunky to escape the land and jump their wall for a joyride that ends with a bee stinging Dawn and having her hand swell up. When Eep takes her back home, Guy, upon finding out, scolds her for her recklessness, ending with him insensitively calling her a "cave-girl". At dinner, tensions rise between the parents as well as Guy and Eep, especially when Dawn's swelling is revealed, culminating in Grug accidentally revealing his and Phil's deal. Having had enough, the Croods decide to leave in the morning, but Guy decides to stay after he and Eep have a falling out. Soon, the land is attacked by Punch Monkeys, monkeys with human-like strength, on account of Grug and Ugga eating a bunch of bananas the Bettermans hoard around their land and have forbidden Grug from eating. Phil reveals he sends the Punch Monkeys the bananas every day so that they leave the Bettermans alone and since Grug and Ugga ate them, the Punch Monkeys become upset and kidnap Grug, Phil, and Guy and take them to their homeland.

As the men are taken, the remaining Croods and Bettermans leave to rescue the men, but eventually get marooned on an island full of Wolf-Spiders, wolves with the characteristics of arachnids. During their time together, Hope finally snaps, lashing out on the Croods and running off. However, during an encounter with the Wolf-Spiders, she learns the error of her ways and accepts the Croods. When they learn the location of the men, they name themselves "The Thunder Sisters", after a female-exclusive clan Gran was in when she was younger. At the Punch Monkey home, Grug, Guy and Phil soon discover that Phil's diversion of a river to irrigate his farm unknowingly deprived the Punch Monkeys of their water supply and that the Punch Monkeys need the bananas not only to eat, but to offer to a large primate monster called the Spiny Mandrilla in hopes of appeasing it. The Punch Monkeys make Grug and Phil fight gladiator-style to see who will be the sacrifice and when they wear each other out, they exchange their bitter feelings with each other, making Guy regret what he said during his and Eep's fallout.

Soon, the Punch Monkeys dress all three men as bananas to sacrifice to the giant Spiny Mandrilla. Grug and Phil apologize for their poor behavior, and for putting pressure on Guy, but just as they are about to be eaten, the Thunder Sisters show up to rescue them. A long and perilous battle ends with Guy and Eep on a giant skull-chandelier where they reconcile and use it to defeat the Spiny Mandrilla by using fire to sever the ropes and send the skull falling into the abyss below. The Spiny Mandrilla climbs back out of the depths and grabs Eep by her "peanut toe", which she uses as a prosthetic phalange, and pulls it off, sending the monster plummeting to its demise and allowing the families to escape the work.

With their differences finally settled, the Bettermans allow the Croods to live in their land as neighbors, with Guy realizing that Eep is his "tomorrow". Guy and Eep soon move into one of the Bettermans’ bedrooms together, which Grug approves of, and the Punch Monkeys become their next door neighbors.

Cast
 Nicolas Cage as Grug Crood, a caveman and the patriarch of the Croods.
 Emma Stone as Eep Crood, a cavewoman, Grug's oldest daughter and Guy's girlfriend.
 Ryan Reynolds as Guy, a caveman with an advanced modern mindset who lives with the Croods and is Eep's boyfriend.
 Gabriel Jack voices a younger Guy, a cute cave boy.
 Catherine Keener as Ugga Crood, a cavewoman and Grug's wife.
 Cloris Leachman as Gran, an old cavewoman who is Ugga's mother and Eep, Thunk, and Sandy's grandmother. This was one of Leachman's last voice overs.
 Clark Duke as Thunk Crood, a cave boy and Grug's son.
 Leslie Mann as Hope Betterman, the matriarch of the Bettermans and Phil's wife.
 Peter Dinklage as Phil Betterman, the patriarch of the Bettermans who had a history with Guy's parents.
 Kelly Marie Tran as Dawn Betterman, Phil and Hope's daughter and only child who befriends Eep and is Guy's old friend.
 Kailey Crawford as Sandy Crood, a cute cave baby girl and Grug's 5-year-old daughter. Her vocal effects were previously performed by Randy Thom in the last movie.
 Chris Sanders as Belt, Guy's pet sloth.
 James Ryan as Sash, Dawn's pet sloth.
 Melissa Disney as Guy's Mom, the unnamed mother of Guy who died in the tar pit.
 Joel Crawford as Guy's Dad, the unnamed father of Guy who died in the tar pit.
 Januel Mercado as Shaman Monkey, the head of the Punch Monkeys.
 Ryan Naylor as Creepo Monkey, a creepy-eyed member of the Punch Monkeys.
 Artemis Pebdani as Additional voices

ADR group provided by Richard Gould, Januel Mercado, Ryan Naylor, James Ryan, Randy Thom and director Joel Crawford.

Production

Development
In April 2013, DreamWorks announced a sequel to the film The Croods, with Chris Sanders and Kirk DeMicco set to return as directors and writers. According to DeMicco, the sequel would focus on Ugga and motherhood, making it "the first chapter of society," expanding on the first film, which he said is about "the last chapter of the caveman."

On June 12, 2014, it was announced that the sequel would be released on November 3, 2017. On August 21, 2014, the film was pushed back to December 22, 2017. On August 9, 2016, nearing Comcast's impending acquisition of DreamWorks Animation, 20th Century Fox removed the film from the release schedule. The film would be instead released by Universal Pictures sometime in 2018. On August 23, 2016, it was reported that Kevin and Dan Hageman were hired to rewrite the script.

On November 11, 2016, DreamWorks announced that production for the sequel was cancelled. According to reports, there had been doubts about proceeding with the project before Universal's acquisition of DreamWorks, and it was DreamWorks' decision to cancel the film. However, in September 2017, DreamWorks and Universal revealed that the film was back in production with a release date scheduled for September 18, 2020. It was also revealed that both DeMicco and Sanders would not be returning. In October 2017, it was reported that Joel Crawford would replace them as director and Mark Swift would replace both the first film's producers Jane Hartwell and Kristine Belson as the producer of the film. Production of the film was shifted to work remotely during the COVID-19 pandemic.

Casting
In September 2013, it had been confirmed that Nicolas Cage, Emma Stone, and Ryan Reynolds would reprise their roles in the sequel as Grug, Eep, and Guy from the first film. On May 21, 2015, Leslie Mann and Kat Dennings had joined the voice cast. Mann would lend her voice to an upscale mother of a rival family named Hope Betterman, while Dennings was set to voice her daughter, Dawn. It was also reported that Catherine Keener and Clark Duke were reprising their roles as Ugga and Thunk. In September 2017, it was confirmed that the original actors would reprise their roles. In October 2018, Peter Dinklage was cast in the film to voice the character Phil Betterman. In October 2019, DreamWorks revealed that Kelly Marie Tran had replaced Dennings as Dawn.

Animation and design
While the first film had some rough details simlair to How to Train Your Dragon, the designs of the second film were more simplified and rendered from Moonray. 2D Animation for the Travel Logs and the Cave Diary was provided by Bird Karma director William Salazar rather than animation from James Baxter on the first film.

Music
In September 2020, it was announced that Mark Mothersbaugh will replace the first film's composer Alan Silvestri as composer for this film. In November 12, 2020, a single called Feel the Thunder was released and performed by HAIM from Trolls World Tour.

Soundtrack

Release

Theatrical
The Croods: A New Age was theatrically released in the United States on November 25, 2020, by Universal Pictures, which was then followed by a PVOD release on December 18. It was previously scheduled to be released on November 3, 2017, December 22, 2017, September 18, 2020, and December 23, 2020. The studio spent about $26.5 million promoting the film. In the United Kingdom, the film was released on July 16, 2021.

Home media
The Croods: A New Age was released by Universal Pictures Home Entertainment on Digital HD and on DVD, Blu-ray, Blu-ray 3D and 4K Ultra HD on February 23, 2021. All the releases include two new short films Family Movie Night: Little Red Bronana Bread and Dear Diary: World's First Pranks, the award-winning short To: Gerard, deleted scenes, an audio commentary and more. It was also released by Universal Sony Pictures Home Entertainment in Australia, along in a 2-movie pack with its 2013 film. It was also released on DVD and Blu-Ray on October 18, 2021, by Warner Bros. Home Entertainment in the UK.

Reception

Box office and VOD
The Croods: A New Age has grossed $58.6 million in the United States and Canada, and $157.4 million in other territories, for a worldwide total of $216 million. It became the first animated film released during the COVID-19 pandemic and the first family film since Sonic the Hedgehog to break the $200 million mark.

In the United States, the film made $1.85 million from 2,211 theaters on its first day, $2.7 million on its second (a 47% increase, opposed to the normal 40% drop seen on Thanksgiving Day), then $4 million on its third. It went on to debut to $9.7 million in its opening weekend (a five-day total of $14.3 million), the biggest opening weekend since Tenet over two months prior. The film remained in first the following two weekends, grossing $4.4 million and $3 million, respectively. It was dethroned by Monster Hunter in its fourth weekend. That same weekend, the film was the most-rented on FandangoNow, Apple TV, and Google Play. In its fifth weekend the film grossed $1.7 million over the Christmas frame. It also remained number one on all digital rental platforms. IndieWire estimated the film had made about $20 million from PVOD sales up to that point (of which Universal would keep 80% of). The film continued to hold steady in subsequent weekends, and regained the top box office spot in its 12th week of release with $2.7 million.

The film earned $3 million on its opening day in China, which is the third biggest for a Hollywood film in 2020, behind Tenet and Mulan. It went on debut to $19.2 million in China, and a total of $21.6 million internationally. By its third weekend of release the film crossed $46 million (RMB 300 million) in China, becoming the second-biggest Hollywood title of the year in the country behind Tenet ($66.6 million). It made $3.2 million in its fourth weekend of international play, pushing its running total above $57 million.

Critical response 
Critics noted The Croods: A New Age as "a decent-enough follow-up" and commended the cast. On review aggregator Rotten Tomatoes, 77% of 155 critics' reviews of the film are positive, and an average rating of 6.4/10. The website's critics consensus reads: "Another agreeable outing for the titular prehistoric clan, The Croods: A New Age may be the missing link for parents between more elevated family-friendly fare." According to Metacritic, which calculated a weighted average score of 56 out of 100 based on 30 critics, the film received "mixed or average reviews". Audiences polled by CinemaScore gave the film an average grade of "A" on an A+ to F scale (the same score as the first film), and PostTrak reported 83% of those gave the film a positive score, with 59% saying they would definitely recommend it.

Ben Kenigsberg of The New York Times gave a mixed-to-positive review, writing "No one would call it a huge leap on the evolutionary ladder, but the animated sequel The Croods: A New Age is slightly funnier than its serviceable 2013 predecessor." Michael O'Sullivan of The Washington Post rated the film 2/4 stars, describing it as a "larky, slightly lunatic film". Lindsey Bahr at Associated Press rated the film 2.5/4, stating "it might not be as novel as the first, but it's essentially harmless, if a little chaotic, fun for kids and doesn't need to be anything more than that". Kate Erbland of IndieWire gave the film a "C+" and said, "It's a little silly, very colorful, and entertaining enough to deliver some good-hearted ideas that aren't beholden to any period in time. Worth nearly a decade of push-pull to get here? Probably not, but on its own merits it's a charming throwback". Alonso Duralde of TheWrap gave the film a positive review and wrote, "You may never have thought you needed or even wanted a sequel to The Croods, but you may find it a pleasant surprise in a year where most of the surprises have been anything but."

In 2021, LA Weekly placed it in the "Top 10" list.

Accolades

Television series
A follow-up animated series, titled The Croods: Family Tree, was announced and set to be released simultaneously on Peacock and Hulu on September 23, 2021. Tran reprises her role as Dawn, while A. J. Locascio reprises his role as Thunk from Dawn of the Croods. The new voice cast features Amy Landecker as Ugga, Kiff VandenHeuvel as Grug, Ally Dixon as Eep, Artemis Pebdani as Gran, Darin Brooks as Guy, Matthew Waterson as Phil, and Amy Rosoff as Hope.

References

External links

3D animated films
2020 3D films
2020 computer-animated films
2020 films
2020s adventure comedy films
2020s American animated films
2020s children's adventure films
2020 comedy films
American 3D films
American adventure comedy films
American children's animated comedy films
American computer-animated films
Animated adventure films
Animated films about families
Animated films set in prehistory
DreamWorks Animation animated films
Films about evolution
Films about cavemen
Animated films about cavemen
Films directed by Joel Crawford
Films scored by Mark Mothersbaugh
Prehistoric life in popular culture
American sequel films
Universal Pictures animated films
Universal Pictures films
The Croods (franchise)
Films with screenplays by The Hageman Brothers
2020s English-language films